Shamil Gadzhialiyevich Lakhiyalov (born 28 October 1979) is a Russian football official and a player of Avar ethnicity. He is the president of FC Legion Makhachkala, and is also registered as a player for the club.

Club career
He made his Russian Premier League debut for FC Terek Grozny on 14 March 2008 in a game against PFC Krylia Sovetov Samara.

In early 2011 he signed a contract with FC Krasnodar as a free agent, but before the league competition even started, another Russian Premier League team, FC Anzhi Makhachkala, bought his contract.

References

External links
 
 
  Player page on the official FC Terek Grozny website
 

1979 births
Living people
Russian footballers
FC Saturn Ramenskoye players
FC Anzhi Makhachkala players
FC Akhmat Grozny players
Russian Premier League players
PFC Krylia Sovetov Samara players
Footballers from Makhachkala
Avar people
Association football midfielders
FC Krasnodar players
FC Dynamo Makhachkala players